David Castle is a Canadian philosopher and bioethicist. He is Vice-President of Research at the University of Victoria. Previously he was Professor and Chair of Innovations in the Life Sciences at University of Edinburgh, where he investigated how to get others to innovate. From 2006 to 2010 he served as Canada Research Chair in Science and Society at the University of Ottawa where he developed ideas leading to the creation of the Institute for Science, Society and Policy.

He received his B.Sc. and B.A. from the University of Alberta, M.A. from McMaster University, and Ph.D. from the University of Guelph, supervised by Michael Ruse.

His research focuses on social issues and government policy relating to biotechnology, especially nutrigenomics.

On June 1, 2016, Dr. Castle was appointed Chair of the Steering Committee of Research Data Canada, an organization supported by CANARIE.

Selected contributions
 Science, Society, and the Supermarket: The Opportunities and Challenges of Nutrigenomics (2006) 
 Genetically Modified Foods: Debating Biotechnology (2002) 
 "A semantic view of ecological theories"  Dialectica (2001)

References

External links
 VP Research, University of Victoria
Profile at Valgen

Living people
University of Alberta alumni
McMaster University alumni
University of Guelph alumni
Canadian philosophers
Academics of the University of Edinburgh
Year of birth missing (living people)